The 2021 Top League was the 18th season of Japan's top tier domestic rugby union competition. The original schedule was for a three stage competition that included all 16 Top League teams plus the top four sides from the Top Challenge League, in preparation for the three-tier professional league planned for 2022. However, due to the COVID-19 pandemic in Japan the season was postponed and re-formatted. 

Under the revised format, the two leagues were played separately. The Top League sides were split into two conferences of eight teams for the first stage, followed by a 16-team knockout stage to decide the champion team.

Teams

Stage One
The 16 Top League sides will be split between a red conference and a white conference. They will only play against teams from their conference.

Red Conference

Ladder

Fixtures & Results
Round 1

Round 2

Round 3

Round 4

Round 5

Round 6

Round 7

White Conference

Ladder

Fixtures & Results
Round 1

Round 2

Round 3

Round 4

Round 5

Round 6

Round 7

Playoff Stage
All sixteen Top League sides plus the top four finishing sides from the 2021 Top Challenge League will be included in the playoff stage. All matches of the playoff stage are knockouts with lower ranked Top League conference teams and the top four Top Challenge League teams playing in the first round to qualify to the round of sixteen.

First round

Bracket

Round of 16

Quarter-finals

Semi-finals

Final

Notes

References

Japan Rugby League One